Ellen Richmond Sauerbrey (born September 9, 1937) is an American politician from Maryland and the former head of the United States Department of State's Bureau of Population, Refugees, and Migration. She was nominated to the Bureau in September 2005 by President George W. Bush. On January 4, 2006, Bush placed her in office by way of a recess appointment, bypassing the need for Senate confirmation.  Her confirmation was unlikely, given strong objections by some senators. Sauerbrey's recess appointment caused some controversy; however, her experience as minority leader in the Maryland House of Delegates and managing a complex U.S. Census project helped rally others to her cause.

Life and career
Sauerbrey was born in Baltimore, Maryland, the only child of Ethel, a secretary/stenographer, and Edgar Richmond, a steelworker for Bethlehem Steel at Sparrows Point. She is a 1955 graduate of Towson High School and a 1959 graduate of Western Maryland College, and was a teacher before entering politics. In 1959, she married Wilmer J.E. Sauerbrey, who is credited with having introduced her to conservative politics.

From 1978 to 1994, she was a Republican member of the Maryland House of Delegates, and served as minority leader from 1986 to 1994. Her committee assignments included the Appropriations Committee; Subcommittee on Education and Transportation; Ways and Means and Economic Matters.

In 1990, she was elected as the national chairman of the American Legislative Exchange Council, serving in 1991 when President George H. W. Bush spoke to the organization.

Sauerbrey ran unsuccessfully for Governor of Maryland twice, in 1994 and 1998. She was defeated by Democrat Parris Glendening both times, the first time by a very narrow margin.  The 1994 election was in doubt as charges of voter fraud led to a lawsuit by the Sauerbrey campaign to overturn the election, which was ultimately unsuccessful.

In 2002, George W. Bush nominated Sauerbrey to be Representative to the United Nations Commission on the Status of Women, of the Economic and Social Council of the United Nations, with the rank of Ambassador. In that post, Sauerbrey focused mostly on three issues: the need for more education for women, the importance of empowering women economically and politically, and protection of the right to life.

In January 2006, while the Senate was recessed, President Bush appointed Sauerbrey as Assistant Secretary of State for Population, Refugees, and Migration. It was reported then that this and other such appointments would end at the conclusion of the congressional session in January 2007.

In a January 15, 2007, hearing before the Senate Judiciary Committee, Democratic lawmakers and advocates for refugees called for increased help for fleeing Iraqis. Sauerbrey said a UN-predicted wave of refugees did not occur right after the U.S.-led invasion of Iraq and was instead occurring at that present time.

Sauerbrey was inducted into the Maryland Women's Hall of Fame in 2013 and has written opinion articles published by The Washington Times as recently as 2017.

In November 2020, amid attempts to overturn the U.S. presidential election, Sauerbrey expressed no regrets about challenging her 1994 election outcome, saying, "I think when you have a pretty good indication that the election is rigged, you should fight". Sauerbrey also questioned the transparency, accuracy, and timeliness involved with counting mail-in ballots.

References

Bibliography
Inexpert Selection, The New York Times, October 11, 2005
Democrats Zero In On Another Nominee The Washington Post, October 26, 2005
Confirm Ellen Sauerbrey The Washington Times, October 25, 2005
Sisterhood V. Sauerbrey National Review Online, November 14, 2005

External links
 Freedom Works – Sauerbrey's blog

|-

|-

|-

1937 births
Living people
20th-century American politicians
20th-century American women politicians
21st-century American politicians
21st-century American women politicians
Ambassadors of the United States
American women ambassadors
Candidates in the 1994 United States elections
Candidates in the 1998 United States elections
George W. Bush administration personnel
Republican Party members of the Maryland House of Delegates
Towson High School alumni
United States Assistant Secretaries of State
Western Maryland College alumni
Women state legislators in Maryland